The 1961 World Shotgun and Running Target Championships were held in Oslo, Norway. While separate world championships in the shotgun events had become traditional, this was the first time the competition also included the 100 metre running deer events. These had been Norwegian specialties but were now dominated by the superpowers, leaving the host country without medals.

Medal count

Results

Shotgun events

Running target events

References 
 All WCH medallists (ISSF website)

ISSF_World_Shooting_Championships
Shooting
S
1961 in Norwegian sport
1960s in Oslo
International sports competitions in Oslo
Shooting competitions in Norway